Parapammene dyserasta is a species of moth of the family Tortricidae. It is found in Australia, where it has been recorded from Queensland.

The wingspan is about 9 mm. The forewings are fuscous, with a suffused whitish spot in the disc and a series of whitish costal strigulae (fine streaks). There is a dark-fuscous line from the midcosta, preceded and 
followed by dull bluish-metallic lines. The hindwings are fuscous.

References

Moths described in 1911
Grapholitini
Moths of Queensland